American singer and songwriter Solange has released four studio albums: Solo Star in 2002, Sol-Angel and the Hadley St. Dreams in 2008, A Seat at the Table in 2016, which peaked at number one in the US Billboard 200 chart, and When I Get Home in 2019. Solange released a music video and single for "Losing You" on October 2, 2012. The single was released in promotion of her first EP, titled True, which Solange worked on with Dev Hynes and was released on November 27, 2012, by Terrible Records.

Albums

Studio albums

Compilation albums

Extended plays

Singles

As lead artist

Notes
A ^ "I Decided" was also released as "I Decided, Pt I" in various countries. The main single release in the United Kingdom of "I Decided" was a Freemasons remix titled "I Decided, Pt II".

As featured artist

Other charted songs

Music videos

Other appearances

Songwriting credits

Notes

References

External links
 Solange Knowles at Discogs

Discographies of American artists
Rhythm and blues discographies
Discography